Herbert Eugene Horowitz (born July 10, 1930 Brooklyn, New York, – March 2, 2019 Pasadena, California), a career member of the Senior Foreign Service, Class of Minister-Counselor, was the American Ambassador to The Gambia  (1986–1989), consul general in Sydney, Australia, 1981-1984, and was deputy chief of mission at the Embassy in Beijing, China, from 1984 to 1986.

Biography
Horowitz grew up in Crown Heights, Brooklyn and graduated from Boys High School (Brooklyn). He attended Alfred University for two years before transferring to Brooklyn College (B.A., 1952). He went on to earn a M.A. in 1964 from Columbia University and M.A. in 1965 from the Fletcher School of Law and Diplomacy.

Horowitz joined the Foreign Service in 1956 and was assigned as economic officer at the Embassy in Taipei, Taiwan. He returned Washington in 1962 to become economic officer, Office of East Asia and China Affairs.

A resident of Washington, DC, Horowitz was visiting his son in California when he died of a stroke in California.

References

1930 births
2019 deaths
Ambassadors of the United States to Gabon
People from Crown Heights, Brooklyn
Brooklyn College alumni
Columbia University alumni
The Fletcher School at Tufts University alumni
Boys High School (Brooklyn) alumni
Alfred University alumni
20th-century American Jews
United States Foreign Service personnel
21st-century American Jews